The 1955 Murray State Thoroughbreds football team was an American football team that represented Murray State College—now known as Murray State University—as a member of the Ohio Valley Conference (OVC) during the 1955 college football season. Led Fred Faurot in his eighth and final season as head caoch, the Thoroughbreds compiled an overall record of 6–4 with a mark of 2–3 in conference play, placing fourth in the OVC.

Schedule

References

Murray State
Murray State Racers football seasons
Murray State Thoroughbreds football